Miss Annie Rooney  is a 1942 American drama film directed by Edwin L. Marin. The screenplay by George Bruce has some similarities to the silent film, Little Annie Rooney starring Mary Pickford, but otherwise, the films are unrelated. Miss Annie Rooney is about a teenager (Shirley Temple) from a humble background who falls in love with a rich high school boy (Dickie Moore). She is snubbed by his social set, but, when her father (William Gargan) invents a better rubber synthetic substitute, her prestige rises. Notable as the film in which Shirley Temple received her first on-screen kiss, and Moore said it was his first kiss ever. The film was panned.

Plot
Annie Rooney (Shirley Temple), the 14-year-old daughter of a struggling salesman, falls in love with rich, 16-year-old Marty White (Dickie Moore). While at first, Marty's snobbish friends give Annie the cold shoulder, her jitterbug dancing skills impress, and soon, she is a welcome addition to their circle. Marty's wealthy mother and father, who own a rubber-making business, are not as easily persuaded of Annie's worth. But when her father manages to invent a new form of synthetic rubber, her triumph is complete.

Cast
 Shirley Temple as Annie Rooney, a teenager 
 William Gargan as Tim Rooney, her inventor father 
 Guy Kibbee as Grandpop, her grandfather
 Dickie Moore as Marty White, a rich teenager
 Gloria Holden as Mrs. White, Marty's mother 
 Jonathan Hale as Mr. White, Marty's father
 Peggy Ryan as Myrtle
 Charles Coleman as Sidney, the White's butler
 Roland Dupree as Joey
 Mary Field as Mrs Metz
 George Lloyd as Burns
 Jan Buckingham as Madam Sylvia
 Selmer Jackson as Mr Thomas
 June Lockhart as Stella Bainbridge
 Edgar Dearing as Policeman
 Shirley Mills as Audrey Hollis
 Byron Foulger as Mr. Randall (uncredited)

Production
Temple signed to make one film for United Artists, and it was to be either Little Annie Rooney or Lucky Sixpence. It was eventually decided to film the former. The title was changed to Miss Annie Rooney to reflect Temple's maturity; she was paid $50,000 for her performance.

Temple was 14 when the film was made and received a much-ballyhooed on-screen kiss (from Moore, on the left cheek).

Reception
The film was her second attempt at a comeback, but its teen culture theme was dated, and the film flopped. Temple retired again for another two years. Later, she told Moore the film was a "terrible picture".

Reviews were poor.

Release

Critical reception
The New York Times thought, "'Miss Annie Rooney' is a very little picture. It is a very grim little picture [...] Gingerly, very gingerly, producer Edward Small is breaking the news to the public— baby Shirley doesn't live here anymore. Gone are the days of the toddling tot, the days of milk teeth and tonsils. Instead, we now see a Miss Temple in the awkward age between the paper-doll and sweater-girl period, an adolescent phenomenon who talks like a dictionary of jive, and combines this somehow with quotations from Shakespeare and Shaw."

Home media
In 2009, the film was available on videocassette. As of 2013, the film is available on Netflix Instant Streaming. In 2017, ClassicFlix restored the movie in releases on DVD and Blu-ray.

See also
 Little Annie Rooney
 Shirley Temple filmography

References
 Works cited
 
 
 Web citations

External links 
 
 
 
 

1942 films
1940s teen drama films
American black-and-white films
Films directed by Edwin L. Marin
United Artists films
Films produced by Edward Small
American teen drama films
1942 drama films
1940s English-language films
1940s American films